The Historic Areas of Istanbul are a  group of sites in the capital district of Fatih in the city of Istanbul, Turkey. These areas were added to the UNESCO World Heritage List in 1985.

This World Heritage Site includes buildings and structures such as the Sarayburnu, the Topkapı Palace, the Hagia Sophia, the Sultan Ahmed Mosque, the Hagia Irene, Zeyrek Mosque, Süleymaniye Mosque, Little Hagia Sophia and the Walls of Constantinople.

Zones
The World Heritage site covers four zones, illustrating the major phases of the city's history using its most prestigious monuments:
 the Archaeological Park, which in 1953 and 1956 was defined at the tip of the peninsula;
 the Süleymaniye quarter, protected in 1980 and 1981;
 the Zeyrek quarter, protected in 1979;
 the zone of the ramparts, protected in 1981.

Gallery

History of Istanbul